is a retired badminton player of Japan who won Japanese national and international titles in the late 1970s and the 1980s. Her international victories included the All-England women's doubles with Mikiko Takada in 1978 and the Danish (Denmark) Open women's doubles in 1981 and 1988 with Takada and with Yoshiko Yonekura Tago respectively. Though most of Tokuda's international success came in doubles, she won the Japanese national singles title in 1978. She earned a bronze medal at the 1980 IBF World Championships in women's doubles with Yonekura. Tokuda helped Japan win world team titles in the Uber Cup competitions of 1978 and 1981 by compiling a strong winning record in her individual matches.

References 

Japanese female badminton players
Living people
Asian Games medalists in badminton
Badminton players at the 1978 Asian Games
Badminton players at the 1982 Asian Games
Badminton players at the 1986 Asian Games
Asian Games silver medalists for Japan
Asian Games bronze medalists for Japan
Medalists at the 1978 Asian Games
Medalists at the 1982 Asian Games
Medalists at the 1986 Asian Games
1955 births